Ecbatan may refer to one of these:
 Ekbatan Complex, modern apartment buildings in the western part of Tehran, Iran.
 Ecbatana, the capital of Astyages.
 Ekbatan Metro Station, a station in Tehran Metro Line 5.
 Ekbatan F.C., an Iranian football club.
 Ekbatan (film), a 2012 Iranian movie starring Mazdak Mirabedini